Melinda Gainsford-Taylor  (born 1 October 1971 in Narromine, New South Wales) is a retired Australian athlete, who specialised in sprint events.

In 1995 Gainsford-Taylor won the World Indoor championship over 200 m. During her career she also won international medals at the World Championships and Commonwealth Games. She is the cousin of Australian Olympic backstroke swimmer Josh Watson who won silver in the Men's 4 × 100-metre medley relay at the Sydney Olympics in 2000.

Junior career
In 1989, she won the first of three consecutive Australian Junior 100 m titles, also winning the Junior 200 m championships in 1989 and 1991.

At the 1990 World Junior Championships Gainsford reached the semi-finals of both the 100 and 200 metres sprints and assisted the Australian 4 x 100 metres relay team to a new national junior record of 45.01 seconds.

Senior career
Although Gainsford-Taylor became a world champion in 1995, her senior career really began when she won the first of five 100m/200 m sprint doubles at the 1992 Australian National Championships and won selection in the Olympic team, where she made the semi-finals of the 200m.

In 1993, she won a silver medal at the World Indoor Championships, but later in the season broke down in the 100 m semi-finals of the 1993 World Championships in Athletics.

During 1994, Gainsford-Taylor won a bronze medal at the Commonwealth Games behind her arch-rival Cathy Freeman and set an Australian record for 100 m of 11.12. A year later, she won the 200 m at the 1995 World Indoor Championships in Athletics and took home a bronze medal from the 1995 World Championships in Athletics as part of the Australian 4 x 400 m relay team.

In 1997, defending her World Indoor crown, Gainsford was disqualified for running out of her lane in the semi-final of the 200 m.  Later in the year, she made up for that disappointment with a new Australian record of 22.23 seconds. Soon after, Gainsford-Taylor reached her first individual outdoor final at the Athens World Championships, placing 7th in the 200 m final.

The latter part of her career was hampered by injury. Running with knee problems, she famously broke down metres before the finish when in first place during the 200 m race at the 1998 Commonwealth Games.

During her career, she won a total of thirteen individual open titles – two at 100 yards, six at 100 metres and five over 200 metres.

At her third Olympic Games at Sydney 2000 she made the final of the 200 m sprint, placing 6th, and assisted the Australian 4 x 400 m relay team to a fifth-place finish and a new national record.

Still holding Australian records at 100 m and 200 m, and sharing in 4 x 100 m and 4 x 400 m relay records, Gainsford-Taylor retired in 2002.

Family life
Gainsford-Taylor is married to Mark Taylor and the couple have two children, Nicholas and Gabriella.

Post career
Gainsford-Taylor now works with Little Athletics New South Wales visiting schools. She also provides expert commentary for Australian TV channel One during their coverage of the Australian Athletics Tour.

She is a fan of National Rugby League team the Manly-Warringah Sea Eagles and is a former board member of the club. She is also a member of the "Eagle Angels", a high-profile group of women who excel in their chosen fields and all with a passion for the Sea Eagles. Other members include comedian, author and radio personality Wendy Harmer, World Surfing Champion Layne Beachley, newsreader Tracey Spicer, and swimmer Brooke Hanson.

In 2017 Gainsford-Taylor was appointed a Member of the Order of Australia for significant service to athletics as a sprinter, at the national and international level, and as a role model for young athletes.

Statistics
Personal Bests – outdoor

Personal Bests – indoor

National records
Outdoor

Relays

Indoor

References 
Athletics Australia Profile
 
'Melinda Gainsford-Taylor discusses her kids

Notes 

1971 births
Australian female sprinters
Athletes (track and field) at the 1994 Commonwealth Games
Athletes (track and field) at the 1998 Commonwealth Games
Athletes (track and field) at the 1992 Summer Olympics
Athletes (track and field) at the 1996 Summer Olympics
Athletes (track and field) at the 2000 Summer Olympics
Commonwealth Games silver medallists for Australia
Commonwealth Games bronze medallists for Australia
Olympic athletes of Australia
Living people
World Athletics Championships medalists
Commonwealth Games medallists in athletics
Members of the Order of Australia
World Athletics Indoor Championships medalists
World Athletics Indoor Championships winners
Olympic female sprinters
Medallists at the 1994 Commonwealth Games